Vân Canh may refer to several places in Vietnam:

Vân Canh District, a rural district of Bình Định Province
Vân Canh, Bình Định, a township and capital of Vân Canh District
, a rural commune of Hoài Đức District